Jonny Martinez (born John Martin Martinez, May 6, 1969, San Antonio, Texas) is an American Tejano/country singer, producer, arranger, composer, and songwriter, based in Austin, Texas. He has positioned himself as an independent artist who is interested in recording authentic Tejano, Tex-Mex and country music. He has been recording since 1988, to include "Caminos Chuecos" (1995 Joey International), "Ron Con Coca Cola" (1998 Joey International), "Mujer Mexicana" (2001 AMI Records Latin), "La Callejera" (2004 AMI Records Latin), "Lo Mejor de Jonny Martinez" (AMI Records Latin 2007) "Dedicado A Mi Madre" (2010 AMI Records Latin)and "Admirando a Mi Padre" (2015 AMI Records Latin). Martinez, owner and producer of AMI Records Latin, signed Rebecca Valadez in 2005 and received a Grammy Award nomination in 2006 for Best Tejano Album. In 2007, he also participated as a recording engineer for Ram Herrera, in which the CD was nominated for Best Tejano Album. In 2008 & 2009, Martinez was involved in yet two more CD projects as an engineer with Grammy Nominations under Sunny Sauceda for Tejas Records.

Martinez is following in the footsteps of his father, Tejano Hall of Fame inductee Anselmo "El Chemiro" Martinez, who has traveled coast to coast, recording 13 albums, writing hundreds of world Tejano music and currently singing and writing Christian music with compositions of 146 original songs. Jonny Martinez has ventured into 28 U.S. states, covering Mexico by touring in Monterrey, San Luis, Potosi and Durango.

By age 16, had his debut on-air radio broadcast on San Antonio’s KEDA-AM radio station, where he sang an old standard hit "La Bamba", and was interviewed by Guero Polkas on KEDA in San Antonio, Texas. In January 1990, Martinez won the All campus Southwest Texas State Talent show as a Sigma Nu by singing his rendition of "La Bamba" and "Twist and Shout". Martinez altered those skills with his father by recording an album on Carino Records, with his new group called John Martinez y Carino. Martinez continued his education at Missouri Valley College and graduated in 1992 with a Bachelor of Arts in Communications and an MBA from University of Phoenix. The singer was anxious to record again and began soon after graduating. After interning at Custom Recording Studio with Toby Torres, Jonny Martinez began working as an audio engineer by recording Flaco Jimenez. Joey Records signed two solo artists on July 6, 1994; Jonny Martinez and Michael Salgado.

Discography
Albums in order from newest to oldest

Admirando A Mi Padre
 Caminos Chuecos
 Un Raton
 Hasta Que Llegaste tu
 El Paraiso
 Amorcito Consentido
 No Olvides Que te Quiero
 Mi Nombre Completo
 Jamaican Mi Crazy
 Anoche
 Te Quiero Dar Mi Amor
 Mi Ranchito
 Los Laureles

Dedicado A Mi Madre
 Mi Lindo Tesoro
 Fijate Mama/La Mucura/La Media Naranja/
 Dos Ojas Sin Rumbo
 Maria Isabel
 Margaritaville
 No Volvere
 Cowboy Cumbia
 Muy Grande
 I've Got a Never Ending Love
 Por El Amor A Mi Madre
 Con Mis Ojos Llorosos
 Un Presentimiento
 Jingle Bells

Lo Mejor De Jonny Martinez y Mas
 Mi Florecita
 Mujer Mexicana
 Cumbia Barriente
 Mujer Paseada
 Rosa Maria
 Caminos Chuecos
 Para Que Quiero Tus Besos
 Esa Morenita
 Nadie Nos Separara
 La Musiquera
 Libro Abierto
 Cumbia De La Guitarra
 Tu Te Vas
 Ritmo De La Ola
 Chaparrita De Oro
 Fiesta Sabrosura
 Tu Traicion
 Boom Boom Boom
 Nuestro Amor
 La Callejera
 El Cafetal

La Callejera
 Ni Los Pleatos
 La Callejera
 Nuestro Amor
 Tu Tracion
 Cumbia de la Guitarra
 Fiesta Sabrosura
 Esa Morenita
 Victors Special #1
 Boom Boom Boom
 Pobre

Mujer Mexicana
 Mujer Mexicana
 El Cafetal
 Mujer Paseada
 Libro Abierto
 Mi Guerita
 Que Linda Mujer
 La Suegra
 Simon Blanco
 Tengo Un Amorcito
 Cambiar de Camino

Ron Con Coca Cola
 Ron Con Coca Cola
 Chaparrita De Oro
 Tu Amor
 Cambiar De Camino
 Tengo Un Amorcito
 Ni Tu Ni Nadie Mas
 Rodeo Palace
 Bravomania
 Mi Guerita
 Hijo De Tejas

Caminos Chuecos
 Caminos Chuecos
 La Musiquera
 Pinte Mi Cuarto
 Ritmo De la Ola
 Nadie Nos Separara
 Viejo Libro
 Tu Retrato
 Porque sin ti
 Que Lindos Ojos
 Me Enamore

References
 The Caliente Column
 Contacto Latino Magazine
 The Voice of Tucson Arizona Magazine
 Ramiro Burr's Concert Article on Jonny Martinez
 Jonny Martinez Album Lo Mejor de Jonny Martinez
 Joey International Records
 Grammy Awards Category 62 Nominations
 Shoot it music Publishing

External links 
 jonnymartinez.net - Home
 KEDA RADIO JALAPEÑO

1969 births
Living people
American male singers
Tejano musicians
American musicians of Mexican descent
Hispanic and Latino American musicians
Spanish-language singers of the United States